Antonio Mendoza (born 27 June 1939) is a Filipino former sports shooter. He competed in the 50 metre pistol event at the 1968 Summer Olympics.

References

External links
 

1939 births
Living people
Filipino male sport shooters
Olympic shooters of the Philippines
Shooters at the 1968 Summer Olympics
Sportspeople from Manila
20th-century Filipino people